Sutiyoso (born 6 December 1944) is an Indonesian politician and former general who served as the Director of the State Intelligence Agency from July 2015 to September 2016. Known informally as 'Bang Yos', he also served as the governor of Jakarta, the country's capital, during a turbulent political period from 1997 to 2007. During this time there was a total of five presidents in Indonesia (Suharto, B. J. Habibie, Gus Dur Wahid, Megawati, and SBY). The transitions between presidents were often accompanied by much turmoil and disturbance in the streets of Jakarta. Sutiyoso also served as chairman of the Badminton Association of Indonesia (PBSI) for the period 2004–2008.

He is particularly known for his work in supporting the introduction, in early 2000, of the TransJakarta, a bus rapid transit system, in Jakarta. It is widely agreed that better public transport arrangements are badly needed in Jakarta so the introduction of the TransJakarta system was seen as an important initiative.  However it has not proved easy to ensure that the TransJakarta bus system works well so the arrangements are currently regarded as being of mixed success.

Sutiyoso announced he was standing for the presidency of Indonesia in the 2009 and 2014 election but failed to get enough support to win the nomination. He was also chairman of the Indonesian Justice and Unity Party between 2010–2015.

References

External links
  Profile at TokohIndonesia

1944 births
Governors of Jakarta
People from Semarang
Living people
Indonesian generals
Badminton in Indonesia
Javanese people
Indonesian Muslims